Chetwynd Secondary School (or CSS) is a public high school in Chetwynd, British Columbia, Canada.   CSS is operated by School District 59 Peace River South and is the designated secondary school for the three local primary schools in Chetwynd. The school building is attached to Windrem Elementary School and shares French Immersion teachers with that school.  Dual credit courses are offered in partnership with Northern Lights College.

In addition to core academic subjects, CSS offers courses in (partial list only):
 Automotive
 First Nations studies
 Business studies
 Business computer applications
 Cafeteria training
 Carpentry & cabinet making
 Digital media
 Drama
 Food studies
 Journalism
 Law
 Mechanics
 Theatre performance
 Woodwork

Athletic programs include a Hockey Academy and Junior Rodeo.

CSS is a participant in the school district's International Student Study Program.

CSS was the subject of a study by the University of Lethbridge, "Grief and loss lives in schools: Chetwynd Secondary School : a case study."

References

External links
 Pacific Rim Hockey Academy webpage
 Fraser Institute School Report Card 2010-2011

High schools in British Columbia
Educational institutions in Canada with year of establishment missing